Bănești is a commune in Prahova County, Muntenia, Romania. It is composed of two villages, Bănești and Urleta.

Natives 
 Constantin Marin (1925–2011), conductor, composer, founder of the Madrigal Choir

Gallery

References

Communes in Prahova County
Localities in Muntenia